The 2018 UNOH 200 was the 16th stock car race of the 2018 NASCAR Camping World Truck Series season, the last regular season race of the year, and the 21st iteration of the event. The race was held on Thursday, August 16, 2018, a 0.533 miles (0.858 km) permanent oval-shaped racetrack. The race took the scheduled 200 laps to complete. GMS Racing driver Johnny Sauter would pass an ailing NEMCO Motorsports driver, John Hunter Nemechek and hold off Halmar Friesen Racing driver Stewart Friesen to win his 22nd career NASCAR Camping World Truck Series win, his fifth of the season, and would clinch the regular season championship. Friesen and Nemechek would finish second and third, respectively.

Background 

The Bristol Motor Speedway, formerly known as Bristol International Raceway and Bristol Raceway, is a NASCAR short track venue located in Bristol, Tennessee. Constructed in 1960, it held its first NASCAR race on July 30, 1961. Despite its short length, Bristol is among the most popular tracks on the NASCAR schedule because of its distinct features, which include extraordinarily steep banking, an all concrete surface, two pit roads, and stadium-like seating. It has also been named one of the loudest NASCAR tracks.

Entry list

Practice

First practice 
The first practice session would occur on Thursday, August 16, at 9:05 AM EST, and would last for 50 minutes.

Second practice 
The second and final practice session, sometimes referred to as Happy Hour, would occur on Thursday, August 16, at 11:05 AM EST, and would last for 50 minutes.

Qualifying 
Qualifying was held on Thursday, August 16, at 4:10 PM EST. Since Bristol Motor Speedway is under , the qualifying system was a multi-car system that included three rounds. The first round was 15 minutes, where every driver would be able to set a lap within the 15 minutes. Then, the second round would consist of the fastest 24 cars in Round 1, and drivers would have 10 minutes to set a lap. Round 3 consisted of the fastest 12 drivers from Round 2, and the drivers would have 5 minutes to set a time. Whoever was fastest in Round 3 would win the pole.

Five drivers failed to qualify: Gray Gaulding, Timothy Peters, B. J. McLeod, Norm Benning, and Jennifer Jo Cobb.

Full qualifying results

Race results 
Stage 1 Laps: 55

Stage 2 Laps: 55

Stage 3 Laps: 90

References 

2018 NASCAR Camping World Truck Series
NASCAR races at Bristol Motor Speedway
August 2018 sports events in the United States
2018 in sports in Tennessee